Elizabeth Harman may refer to:

 Elizabeth Harman (philosopher), daughter of Gilbert Harman
 Elizabeth Longford (1906–2002), née Elizabeth Harman, British author
 Elizabeth Harman (vice-chancellor), vice-chancellor of Victoria University, Australia
 Elizabeth M. Harman (born 1973), U.S. federal official